Jean-Luc Cairon (14 February 1962 – 26 February 2022) was a French gymnast, coach and convicted felon.

Career
Cairon was born in Forbach, France.  He competed for his native France in eight events at the 1984 Summer Olympics.  

Cairon was a co-owner and coach at now-defunct Krafft Academy in Tulsa, Oklahoma. He coached for over three years at South Country Gymnastics in Jenks, Oklahoma, and was an assistant women's gymnastics coach at Arizona State University. 

In 2021, an athlete alleged Cairon had groomed her and touched her inappropriately, resulting in a report to the United States Center for SafeSport. Cairon was then arrested, released on bail, showed intent to flee the court's jurisdiction by leaving the United States, and was sentenced to 25 years in prison upon a guilty plea.

Death
On 26 February 2022, Cairon died in prison while serving out his sentence, at the age of 60.

References

External links

1962 births
2022 deaths
People from Forbach
French male artistic gymnasts
Gymnasts at the 1984 Summer Olympics
Olympic gymnasts of France
French people who died in prison custody
Prisoners who died in Oklahoma detention
Sportspeople from Moselle (department)
French expatriate sportspeople in the United States
Sportspeople convicted of crimes
French people convicted of child sexual abuse
French people convicted of sexual assault
Gymnastics coaches